Each country's final squad has to comprise 21 players. FIFA announced the squads on 5 November 2018.

Group A

Uruguay
Head coach: Ariel Longo

Ghana
Head coach: Evans Adotey

New Zealand
Head Coach: Leon Birnie

Finland
Head Coach: Marko Saloranta

Group B

Mexico
Head Coach: Mónica Vergara

South Africa
Head Coach: Simphiwe Dludlu

Brazil
Head Coach: Luizão

Japan
Head Coach: Futoshi Ikeda

Group C

United States
Head Coach:  Mark Carr

Cameroon
Head Coach: Stéphane Ndzana

North Korea
Head Coach: Song Sung-gwon

Germany
Head coach: Ulrike Ballweg

Group D

South Korea
Head Coach: Hur Jung-jae

Spain
Head Coach: Toña Is

Canada
Head Coach: Rhian Wilkinson

Colombia
Head Coach: Didier Luna

References

2018 squads